Kiuruvesi is a town and municipality of Finland located in the Northern Savonia region.
Neighbour municipalities are Iisalmi, Pielavesi, Pyhäjärvi, Pyhäntä and Vieremä.
The municipality is unilingually Finnish.

The educational department takes part in Lifelong Learning Programme 2007–2013 in Finland.

Notable residents
Jari Huttunen, rally driver
Paavo Lonkila, cross country skier
Elias Simojoki, Leading figure in the fascist movement in the 1930's

Politics
Results of the 2011 Finnish parliamentary election in Kiuruvesi:

Centre Party   41.7%
True Finns   20.8%
Left Alliance   14.6%
National Coalition Party   12.2%
Social Democratic Party   5.6%
Christian Democrats   2.7%
Green League   1.6%

See also
Näläntöjärvi

References

External links

Town of Kiuruvesi – Official website

 
Cities and towns in Finland
Populated places established in 1873